Ash Wednesday is a 2002 American crime drama film written, directed, and starring Edward Burns, alongside Elijah Wood and Rosario Dawson. The film is set in the early 1980s in New York City's Hell's Kitchen neighborhood and tells the story of a pair of Irish-American brothers who become embroiled in a conflict with the Irish mob.

Plot

Hell's Kitchen on Ash Wednesday, 1983: As rumors are flying that Francis Sullivan's (Edward Burns) younger brother Sean (Elijah Wood) who has been presumed dead for three years, appeared out of nowhere. It was afraid that the old killers might take a second stab at Francis's and Sean's life. An upstart approaches the local mob boss, who is Francis's protector for a hit job. Sean's wife, Grace (Rosario Dawson) believed she was a widow all these years until Sean came back for her. The parish priest who was deceived initially, is feeling anxious. As bad guys with guns are closing in, Francis should get Sean and his wife out of the city. Can Francis avoid a war between rival factions, and hold onto a new found morality? Will the cross of ashes on his forehead protect him?

At the end, Francis helps Sean reunite with Grace and his son, Sean Jr., as they head out of the city together in the back of a van. But Francis decides to stay back to stop Moran (Oliver Platt). The film closes with Francis wiping the cross of ashes from his forehead. The final credit consists of Francis being shot dead, while stepping outside the pub as the sniper leaves the scene before the police arrives.

Cast
 Edward Burns as Francis "Fran" Sullivan
 Elijah Wood as Sean Sullivan
 Rosario Dawson as Grace Quinonez
 Oliver Platt as Moran
 James Handy as Father Mahoney
 Brian Burns as Mike Moran, Moran's Cousin
 Vincent Rubino as Vinny Boombata
 James Cummings as J.C. Moran, Moran's Brother
 Pat McNamara as "Murph" Murphy
 John DiResta as Pete
 Malachy McCourt as "Whitey" Smith
 Peter Gerety as Uncle Handy
 Brian Delate as George "Crazy George" Cullen
 Jimmy Burke as "Red" Kelly
 Teresa Yenque as Mrs. Diaz
 Julie Hale as Maggie Shea
 Kathleen Doyle as Mrs. Flanagan
 Marina Durell as Mrs. Quinonez 
 Michael Mulhern as Detective Pulaski
 Michael Leydon Campbell as Jimmy Burke
 Dara Coleman as John Coleman
 Penny Balfour as Callie
 Kevin Kash as Paulie "Numbers"
 Gregg Bello as Larossa, Vinny's Brother
 Joe Lisi as Charlie, The Wiseguy
 Jack DeFuria as Sean "Little Sean" Sullivan Jr.

Critical reception and box office
The film holds a 25% "rotten" rating on the website Rotten Tomatoes based on an aggregate score from 16 reviews. On Metacritic, the film holds a score of 40 out of 100 based on 7 critics, indicating mixed or average reviews. The film was only released in two theaters and grossed less than $3,000.

References

External links
 
 
 

2002 films
2002 crime drama films
American crime drama films
2000s English-language films
2000s Spanish-language films
Films set in Manhattan
Films set in the 1980s
Films shot in New York (state)
American independent films
Films directed by Edward Burns
Films about the Irish Mob
Films scored by David Shire
2002 independent films
2002 multilingual films
American multilingual films
2000s American films